Dolichoneura is a genus of moths in the family Geometridae.

Species
 Dolichoneura albidentata Warren, 1894
 Dolichoneura innotata Warren, 1894

References
 Dolichoneura at Markku Savela's Lepidoptera and Some Other Life Forms
 Natural History Museum Lepidoptera genus database

Desmobathrinae
Geometridae genera